The Kitchen is a Michelin-starred farm-to-fork restaurant in Sacramento, California.

History
The Kitchen was opened at Marconi Avenue in 1991 by chefs Randall Selland and Nancy Zimmer, both husband and wife, alongside Nancy's catering business. Randall and Nancy moved the restaurant and her catering business to 2225 Hurley Way in 1997. In 2001, Selland's Market Cafe was opened at 5340 H Street, and Nancy reduced her catering business from full service to only drop-offs and pickups from the cafe.

The Kitchen's executive chef is Kelly McCown, who has worked at the restaurant since 1990s. Its menu has been seasonal. In 2003, Tuesday nights were reserved for only private dining, and it publicly operated from Wednesday to Saturday nights per week.

Besides The Kitchen and the East Sacramento location of Selland's Market Cafe, the Selland Family Restaurants group also operates another farm-to-fork restaurant Ella Dining Room and Bar, an Italian eatery OBO' Italian Table and Bar, and El Dorado Hills and Broadway (Sacramento) locations of Selland's Market Cafe. Members of the restaurant group and of other groups on August 31, 2019, opened a fried chicken restaurant Bawk, fully owned by Urban Roots Brewing & Smokehouse since its reopening on October 28, 2020.

Announced in April 2015, the site of 915 Broadway was the planned relocation of The Kitchen. The  property included the  building and was bought for USD$2.6 million (equivalent to $ million in ). The Broadway site after the January 2016 announcement eventually became the third location of Market Cafe, the chain that has had broader appeal, due to feedback from customers who wanted another Market Cafe location. Meanwhile, The Kitchen underwent renovations: "expanded wine cellar", "redone bathrooms", and increased space for dining rooms. The restaurant's bakery section was relocated to the Cafe's Broadway site. Its office, consolidated with the office of the Cafe's H Street site, was relocated to another site.

Amid the COVID-19 pandemic, The Kitchen was closed throughout most of the year 2020 until October 14.

Reception
As of 2019, The Kitchen has received highest Zagat ratings and the AAA Five Diamond Award consecutively since 2011. OpenTable named it one of top 100 restaurants in the United States providing "best service" in 2012 and then "100 Best Restaurants" in the US for 2016. The Kitchen received its first Michelin star on June 3, 2019, becoming the first Michelin-starred restaurant in Sacramento. The USA Today in August 2019 ranked it thirtieth out of its top thirty restaurants in the US, reviewed by 24/7 Wall St.

As of September 2021, The Kitchen remains the only Michelin-starred restaurant in the city.

References

External links
 

Michelin Guide starred restaurants in California
1991 establishments in California
Restaurants in California
Restaurants established in 1991